Governor Holmes may refer to:

David Holmes (politician) (1769–1832), 1st and 5th Governor of Mississippi
Gabriel Holmes (1769–1829), 21st Governor of North Carolina
Robert D. Holmes (1909–1976), 28th Governor of Oregon